Jack Pratt, born John Harold Pratt, (1878–1938)  was a Canadian film director and actor. He directed several films and acted in dozens more. As a director, his work included screen adaptations of novels.

Known as Smiling Jack, he married actress Betty Brice. She starred in the 1916 film Her Bleeding Heart he directed and was also in the film Gods of Fate.

He was hired by Lubin as a director in 1915. He served as President of the Lubin Benefit Association, associated with Lubin Manufacturing Company.

Filmography

Director
The Little Pirate (1913)
Shore Acres (1914)
The Jungle (1914), one of the directors of an adaptation of Upton Sinclair's 1906 novel
The Garden of Lies (1915)
The Rights of Man: a Story of War's Red Blotch (1915)
The Gods of Fate (1916)
Her Bleeding Heart (1916)
The Woman Untamed (1920)
The Heart of a Woman (1920)
Roman Candles (1920)

Actor
Dan (1914), as Stonewall Jackson
Ridin Thunder
Bright Skies
 The Little Wanderer (1920) as Tully
 Hush (1921)
 Back to Yellow Jacket (1922) as William Carson
The Lone Hand (1922), as Jack Maltrain 
The Western Wallop (1924), as Convict Leader
The Iron Man (1924), a serial
A Roaring Adventure (1925) as Brute Kilroy
The Sign of the Cactus (1925), as Sheriff 
The Wild Horse Stampede (1925), as Henchman 
Ace of Spades (1925)
Ridin' Thunder (1925)
The Red Rider (1925)
The House Without a Key (1926), a serial, as James Egan 
Hawk of the Hills (1927), a serial, as Colonel Jennings
The Western Whirlwind (1927)
 Rough and Ready (1927) as Parson Smith
 Wild Beauty (1927) as Davis
Heart Trouble (1928), as Army Captain Bob Reeves 
The Desert Song (1929), as Pasha

References

1878 births
1938 deaths
Film directors from New Brunswick
Male actors from New Brunswick
Canadian male film actors